Lagenochitina is an extinct genus of chitinozoans. It was described by Alfred Eisenack in 1931.

Species
 Lagenochitina baltica Eisenack, 1931
 Lagonochitina estonica eisenack Elsevier Microfossil Wall Chart, F.G Koenig, 1993
 Lagenochitina cylindrica Eisenack, 1931
 Lagenochitina dalbyensis (Laufeld, 1967)
 Lagenochitina deunffi Paris, 1974
 Lagenochitina esthonica Eisenack, 1955
 Lagenochitina longiformis (Obut, 1995)
 Lagenochitina prussica Eisenack, 1931
 Lagenochitina tumida Umnova, 1970

References

Prehistoric marine animals
Fossil taxa described in 1931